Polydore Plasden (1563–1591) was one of the Catholic Forty Martyrs of England and Wales. A native of London, he studied for the priesthood at Rheims and Rome and was ordained in 1586 before being sent back to England soon after.

Life
Polydore Plasden was born in 1563, the son of a London horner. He was educated at Rheims and at the English College at Rome, where he was ordained priest on 7 December 1586. He remained at Rome for more than a year, and then was at Rheims from 8 April till 2 September 1588, when he was sent on the mission. While at Rome he had signed a petition for the retention of the Jesuits as superiors of the English College, but in England he was considered to have suffered injury through their agency. Plasden ministered in Sussex and in London from 1588 to 1591. He was captured on 2 November 1591, in London, at Swithun Wells' house in Gray's Inn Fields, where Edmund Gennings was celebrating Mass.

On 6 December together with Edmund Gennings and Eustace White, priests, and Sydney Hodgson, Swithin Wells, and John Mason, laymen, he was tried before the King's Bench, and condemned for coming into England contrary to law.

At his execution on 10 December 1591, he acknowledged Elizabeth as his lawful queen, whom he would defend to the best of his power against all her enemies, and he prayed for her and the whole realm, but said that he would rather forfeit a thousand lives than deny or fight against his religion. Plasden was hanged, drawn, and quartered at Tyburn.
By the orders of Sir Walter Raleigh, he was allowed to hang till he was dead, and the sentence was carried out upon his corpse.

He was beatified in 1929, and was canonized in 1970 by Pope Paul VI as one of the Forty Martyrs of England and Wales.

References

External links
"Decree Of The Sacred Congregation Of Rites, On The Introduction Of The Cause of Beatification or Declaration of Martyrdom, of Two Hundred And Sixty-One Venerable Servants Of God, Who Were Put To Death In England For The Faith"
Howell, David. "Every Drop of Blood the Seed of a Future Harvest", L'Osservatore Romano, 15 December 2010, p.8

1591 deaths
16th-century English Roman Catholic priests
Forty Martyrs of England and Wales
English Roman Catholic saints
People executed under Elizabeth I by hanging, drawing and quartering
Executed people from London
16th-century Christian saints
16th-century Roman Catholic martyrs
1563 births